Tres Cool, L.A. Girls EP is an EP by electronic dance music group Jupiter Rising. It contains 2 songs by Jupiter Rising from their latest album The Quiet Hype. The songs  were debuted on MTV's The Hills on November 17, 2008.It was Released to digital music stores on December 16, 2008.

Track listing 
From Amazon.com.
 "L.A. Girls" Jupiter Rising  - 3:24
 "Tres Cool" Jupiter Rising - 3:33

References 

Electronic EPs
Dance music EPs
2008 EPs
Jupiter Rising albums